Velija "Dedo" Bećirspahić (born 1943) was a Bosnian football player and a coach. Widely known by his nickname Dedo (grandpa) due to early hair hoariness, he spent his entire professional career with FK Željezničar.

Club career
He started his career in FK Pofalićki, a small club from Sarajevo. He was spotted there by coaches of FK Željezničar and in 1967 signed a contract with the club in which he would spend the rest of his career. At first, this left-footed player was a winger, but later he was moved to defence. He would become one of the most recognizable left backs in Yugoslav First League with a hard-nosed, old school attitude - "ball can get through, but not the player".

He played 222 league matches for FK Željezničar, scoring 12 goals. He was a member of the team that won Yugoslav championship in 1971–72 season. He retired in 1975.

Managerial career
After that, he became a coach of FK Željezničar youth squad. In 1978, Ivica Osim selected him to be one of his assistant coaches in FK Željezničar.

Personal life
He suffered from and then died of cancer.

References

1943 births
Year of death missing
Footballers from Sarajevo
Association football fullbacks
Association football wingers
Yugoslav men's footballers
FK Željezničar Sarajevo players
NK Jedinstvo Bihać players
Yugoslav First League players